Methylophaga sulfidovorans is an obligately methylotrophic, aerobic, dimethylsulfide-oxidizing bacterium. It is Gram-negative, oval, with strain RB-1.

References

Further reading
De Zwart, J., J. Sluis, and J. Gijs Kuenen. "Competition for Dimethyl Sulfide and Hydrogen Sulfide by Methylophaga sulfidovorans and Thiobacillus thioparus T5 in Continuous Cultures." Applied and Environmental Microbiology 63.8 (1997): 3318–3322.
de Zwart, Jolyn Martha Maria. "Ecophysiology and Modeling of DMS metabolism by Methylophaga sulfidovorans." (1997).

External links

LPSN
Type strain of Methylophaga sulfidovorans at BacDive -  the Bacterial Diversity Metadatabase

Piscirickettsiaceae
Bacteria described in 1998